Pteralyxia is a genus of plants in the family Apocynaceae, first described as a genus in 1895. The entire genus is endemic to the Hawaiian Islands.

Species
Pteralyxia kauaiensis Caum  (syn P. elliptica) - Kauai
Pteralyxia laurifolia (G.Lodd.) Leeuwenb. (syn P. macrocarpa, P. caumiana) - Oahu

References

 
Apocynaceae genera
Endemic flora of Hawaii
Taxonomy articles created by Polbot